Navotas, officially the City of Navotas, is a 1st class highly urbanized city in the National Capital Region of the Philippines. According to the 2020 census, it has a population of 247,543 people.

It is known as the Commercial Fishing Hub of the Philippines, for the city has the third largest fish port in Asia and the largest in Southeast Asia. Although it was established on December 20, 1827, Navotas celebrates its foundation day every January 16, the day in 1906 when it finally separated from Malabon. Navotas became a highly urbanized city on June 24, 2007.

Etymology
The entire region of Navotas was once part of Malabon. According to one legend, the long and narrow delta extended unbroken from north to south along the seashore. The strip of land between the former district of Tondo, Manila and this town was eaten away by the sea until an opening was made. Water began to flow through the opening. The geographical change prompted the people to refer to the place as "butas", "nayon ng butas", or "nabutas", a Tagalog word that means breached or pierced through. What began as a natural channel developed into a regular waterway, now known as the Navotas River. In later years, the place came to be known as "Nabotas", then "Navotas".

It was also known as Hacienda de Navotas; it was once owned by the Dominican friars until it was sold to the Pascual family during the early days of the American regime and developed into a residential estate.

San Jose de Navotas was the name given to the locality after its patron saint, Saint Joseph. On June 11, 1859, a "Superior Decreto" established a new parish and municipality under the supervision of Friar Matias Navoa. The populace was divided into two distinct groups, the naturales (locals) and the mestizos. Mariano Estrellas was the gobernadorcillo (petty governor) of the naturales and Mariano Israel, of the mestizos. Today, because records are incomplete, recognition is only given to the gobernadorcillos for the mestizos. A school in honor of San Jose was built and known as "San Jose Academy."

History

Historical timeline
December 20, 1827 – The movement for separation of Navotas which was then a part of Malabon (Tambobong).
February 16, 1859 – The date when the barrios of San Jose, Navotas and Bangculasi were separated from Malabon.
1859 – Cavada, the year when Navotas became an independent town.
August 6, 1898 – Navotas joined the revolutionary government of General Emilio Aguinaldo.
June 11, 1901 – Navotas was eventually incorporated from the province of Manila into the newly created province of Rizal  with the enactment of Act No. 137.
October 12, 1903 – the town was again merged with Malabon by virtue of Act No. 942.
January 16, 1906 – Navotas finally became an independent municipality with the enactment of Act No. 1442 which separated it from Malabon.
November 7, 1975 – Navotas was transferred from the Province of Rizal to the newly formed National Capital Region or Metro Manila, by virtue of Presidential Decree No. 824.
June 24, 2007 – Navotas became a highly urbanized city by virtue of Republic Act No. 9387 dated March 10, 2007, after a plebiscite was conducted.

Geography

Topography
Navotas is a coastal town in the northwest part of Metro Manila. It is bordered on the north by Obando, Bulacan along Sukol Creek which separates it from Balt; on the south by the city of Manila; on the east by the cities of Malabon and Caloocan and bodies of water such as Binuangan River, the Daang Cawayan River, the Dampalit River, the Batasan River, the Navotas River, the Bangculasi Channel, the Malabon Channel and the Estero de Maypajo; and on the west by Manila Bay.

Climate

Barangays

Navotas is politically subdivided into 2 districts, with 18 barangays:

Population Changes

Some barangays in Navotas experienced dramatic population change between 2010 and 2020.  This is because of an ongoing effort by the government to relocate informal settlers from hazard-prone areas to socialized housing built in Barangay Tanza 2.

Navotas East
Navotas East is bounded by Barangay Sipac-Almacen to the north, Barangay Tañong of Malabon (via Estrella Bridge over Navotas River) to the east, Barangay Navotas West to the west, and Brgy. Bagumbayan North to the south. Their patron saint is San Ildefonso.

San Jose

The name of Barangay San Jose was derived from the Diocesan Shrine and Parish of San Jose de Navotas, the first place of worship in the town.

San Roque
Barangay San Roque is bounded by Tangos South to the northwest and north, Tangos North and Tanza, Navotas (via Badeo 5) to the northeast, Brgy. Hulong Duhat, Malabon and Brgy. Flores, Malabon in Malabon to the east (via Navotas River, Badeo 4), Manila Bay to the west and Brgy. Daanghari to the south. Its name is derived from San Roque de Navotas Parish, the first place of worship in the town.

It is famous for its annual fiesta, every last Saturday and Sunday of the month of January. Every fiesta the whole barangay (including Brgy's Tangos North and Tangos South) is filled with stalls and stores. Also every fiesta of San Roque, A. Dela Cruz St. is full of stalls which sell kalamay, from Batangas.

Sipac-Almacen
Barangay Sipac-Almacen is famous for the location of the Navotas City Hall and some points of interest like Navotas National High School, the main high school of Navotas, Navotas Playground, Jollibee, McDonald's and others.

Former Barangays
Until 2018 Navotas had 14 barangays.

Northbay Boulevard South
In accordance with Republic Act No. 10933, approved by President Rodrigo Duterte on August 23, 2017, and ratified in a plebiscite on January 5, 2018, Northbay Boulevard South was divided into Barangays NBBS Kaunlaran, NBBS Dagat-dagatan, and NBBS Proper.

Tangos
Pursuant to Republic Act No. 10934, approved by President Rodrigo Duterte on August 23, 2017, and ratified in a plebiscite on January 5, 2018, Tangos was divided into Barangays Tangos North and Tangos South.

Tanza
Barangay Tanza occupied the northernmost portion of the city, including Isla Pulo which is separated from the city proper, and was bounded by Barangay Binuangan and Salambao in Obando, Bulacan to the north, Manila Bay and Barangay San Roque to the west, Barangay Hulong Duhat and Dampalit, Malabon to the east, and Barangay Tangos to the south.

By virtue of Republic Act No. 10935, approved by President Rodrigo Duterte on August 23, 2017, and ratified in a plebiscite on January 5, 2018, Tanza was divided into Barangays Tanza 1 and Tanza 2.

Both Tanza 1 and Tanza 2 are accessible via Badeo 5 in Barangay San Roque, Navotas and the Tanza-Malabon Bridge in Barangay Hulong Duhat in Malabon.

Demographics

Economy

Fishing and Aquaculture

Navotas has been dubbed as the Fishing Capital of the Philippines. The city is home to the Navotas Fish Port Complex, which is considered as the Philippines's premier fish center.

Shipbuilding and repair
In the ship repair sector, the Navotas complex is expected to accommodate 96 vessels for repair.

Government

Political profile

With regards to the separation of Navotas from Malabon in 1859 and the organization thereof as a distinct municipality or "pueblo" with its own government and church, this town was headed by the
governadorcillos who exercised executive and judicial functions.
However, as this locality was composed of two groups the naturales and the mestizos, each of which had its own governadorcillo appointed by the governor-general who was the supreme authority in all local matters, since the inhabitants did not allow choosing their officials. This political system was somehow revoked at the end of the Spanish Regime through the Maura Law of 1883, which guided some of the selected officials to the supervision of an insular authority. During the revolutionary period (from 1898 to 1902), as the democratic system of local governance was being established via the First Philippines Republic and Malolos Constitution, people of Navotas with high character, social position and honorable conduct gathered in a meeting and elected the chief of the town, the
headman of the barrio (barangay) and three officials viz., for police and internal order, justice and civil registry, and taxes and property. In this situation, these elected officials constitute an assembly wherein the chief of the
town was the president, the headman, the vice-president, and the justice officer the secretary. In this period, the name of Navotas LGU and its head were changed from "pueblo to municipality" and from "President to Mayor". Philippine Commission, which exercised supervision over local government, appointed the first local
official. Gradually, election of officials was allowed.

During the period of the Philippine Commonwealth (from 1935 to 1945), the 1935 constitution ushered.
This provided that the President of the Philippines should exercise general supervision over all local
governments. This allowed Navotas to have three leaders. This trend from 1946 to 1972 (during the second Philippine Republic) was toward decentralization. Congress passed laws giving more autonomy to Local Government Units through the grant of additional powers and lessening of national control affairs. This created four Mayors of Navotas. During the Martial Law Period, President Marcos had changed the structure and functions of LGU's, thus
decentralization suffered the set back with the concentration of power on his hands. After December 31, 1975 (expiration of tenure of office of the local elective officials), the President assumed the power of appointment of
the officials as authorized by the people in a referendum held on February 27, 1975. During the Marcos Regime, Navotas had two Mayors.

Navotas was proclaimed as a full-fledged city by virtue of RA 9387 that converted the municipality of Navotas into a highly urbanized city. A plebiscite was held on June 24, 2007, which was ratified the conversion of Navotas into a highly urbanized city.

Education

Navotas has 15 public elementary schools and 6 public secondary schools including Navotas National High School and Kaunlaran High School. The Navotas Polytechnic College located at the North Bay Boulevard South in Kaunlaran Village is owned and operated by the city.

Transportation

Transportation in Navotas is composed of different vehicles.

Notable personalities

 Lean Alejandro,  student leader and left-wing nationalist political activist
 Luz Oliveros-Belardo, National Scientist of the Philippines for Phytochemistry
 Engracia Cruz-Reyes, chef and entrepreneur
 Jorella Marie de Jesus, professional volleyball player
 Froilan Baguion, professional basketball player
 Gerald Santos, singer and actor
 Jelo Acosta, rapper & actor
 Wendy Valdez, beauty queen, and an actress.
 Ate Negi, Comedian, Host

Sister cities
  Parañaque, Philippines
  Manila, Philippines

Notes

References

External links

 
 [ Philippine Standard Geographic Code]

 
Cities in Metro Manila
Populated places on Manila Bay
Populated places established in 1859
1859 establishments in the Philippines
Port cities and towns in the Philippines
Highly urbanized cities in the Philippines